Estadio Gonzalo Pozo Ripalda is a multi-use stadium in southern Quito, Ecuador. It is currently used mostly for football matches and is the home stadium of Aucas. The stadium holds 18,799 spectators and built in 1987 and opened in 1994.

British Heavy Metal band Iron Maiden performed in the stadium as part of their Somewhere Back in Time World Tour on March 10, 2009.

References

Football venues in Quito
S.D. Aucas
Sports venues completed in 1994
1994 establishments in Ecuador